The Love Affairs of Nathaniel P. is a novel by Adelle Waldman.

Plot 
The Love Affairs of Nathaniel P. focuses on the titular character, Nathaniel Piven, the "product of a postfeminist, 1980s childhood and politically correct, 1990s college education."

Reception 
The New York Times called the novel "small and specific, drained of history and ethnicity, attendant to the pangs of its social conscience but committed, still, to its fascination with the well-being of those who have already won." NPR said it is "a sharp and assured tale about a sharp and assured young man, who often acts like a dog." The Washington Post referred to the novel as "a delectable, dark account of Manhattan amour."

References

External links 
 The Love Affairs of Nathaniel P. at Adelle Waldman's website
 The Love Affairs of Nathaniel P. on Goodreads

2013 American novels
Henry Holt and Company books